The Mercedes-Benz 170 S is a luxury car which was produced by Mercedes-Benz from 1949 until 1955 in various gasoline and diesel powered forms.  It was initially offered with a 1.8 liter version of the 1.7 liter inline-four cylinder M136 engine used in the slightly smaller production type 170 V. It was the first Mercedes-Benz to carry in its name the suffix “S” (for Sonder modell (Special model) denoting a superior level of comfort and quality.  As such, its intended market was successful business owners and company directors.

The 170 S was released in May 1949, initially sharing the chassis number of the W136 170 V, and closely resembled it. However, in several respects it was more directly a development from the six cylinder Mercedes-Benz 230 which the company had produced, albeit in small numbers, between 1938 and 1943.

The first 170 S upgrade occurred in January 1952, being further distanced from the 170 V with its own chassis number W191. Mercedes' introduction a year earlier of the 2.2 liter six cylinder M180 engined Mercedes-Benz W187 luxury 220 model, positioned between the 170 S and the company flagship 3.0 liter Mercedes-Benz W186 Adenauer tourers undermined the four cylinder 170 S's luxury niche.

With the arrival of the all-new 1.8 liter Mercedes-Benz W120 180 "Ponton" in 1953 the 170 S was discontinued and a 170 S-V employing the 170 S' larger engine but the 170 V's slightly smaller body was introduced.  It ceased production in 1955.

Models

170 S (1949–1952)
The Mercedes-Benz 170 S which appeared in May 1949 was  longer,  wider, and better appointed than the 170 V.  The 170 V's 1697 cc M136 four cylinder gasoline/petrol engine was enlarged to 1767cc, providing a maximum output of 52 HP (38 kW) compared to the smaller car's 38 HP (28 kW).   Performance was correspondingly enhanced, with a stated top speed of 122 km/h (76 mph). It shared the four speed all-synchromesh transmission of the 170 V.   

The front wheels were attached using coil springs and double wishbones with a stabilizer bar, as opposed to the simple lateral leaf-spring arrangement on the 170 V.

Since the war the only version of the Mercedes-Benz 170 V available to the public had come with a four-door sedan/saloon body.   With the 170 S the manufacturer now recalled some of the wider range of bodies offered on the 170 V before the war, adding a 2-seat “Cabriolet A” and a 4-seat “Cabriolet B”.

Although the 170 S was promoted as a car for company directors, the soubriquet of “first S-Class Mercedes-Benz” which began to be applied to it more than twenty years later, following the launch of the manufacturer's W 116 is not one that would have been used or recognized in the 1950s.

A year after the introduction of the 170 S, its M136 was also installed in the 170 V.   However, both the compression ratio and the carburettor differed, so that the power advantage for the 170 S was merely reduced – from a difference of 14 PS to one of 7 PS – and not eliminated.

170 Sb / 170 DS (1952–1953)
In January 1952 the Mercedes-Benz 170 Sb replaced the 170 S model. The car now received a works number of its own, becoming known internally as the “Mercedes-Benz W 191”. Both cabriolet versions had been withdrawn in November 1951, cabriolet buyers now being catered for by the cabriolet versions of the 6-cylinder Mercedes-Benz W187 220 model. The 170 Sb was therefore available only with a four-door sedan/saloon body. Other changes included in the 1952 upgrade included the replacement of the floor-mounted gear lever with a then fashionable column mounted gear lever. There was now a starter button on the dashboard and the heater was improved.

January 1952 also saw the launch of a diesel powered version of the 170 S, sold as the Mercedes-Benz 170 DS and carrying, like its gasoline/petrol powered sibling, the works designation „W 191“.   It shared the 40 HP (29 kW; OM 636 diesel power unit of the diesel powered 170 V and came with the same official top speed of 105 km/h (65 mph).   In 1952 diesel powered passenger cars were still very much a novelty even in Germany.   The relatively lumpy engine note and reduced performance of the diesel car were at variance with the up-market image of the 170 S, but no doubt both cost conscious company directors and upmarket taxi operators appreciated the >25% improvement in fuel consumption using a fuel which, on account of the tax rates applied, was already provided at a relatively “friendly” price in Germany.

170 S-V / 170 S-D (1953–1955)
With the appearance of the new 1.8 liter Mercedes-Benz 180 "Ponton" in 1953, the 170 S model suddenly appeared very old fashioned.  The 170 V would be delisted in September 1953, and in  July 1953 the manufacturer replaced the existing 170 S with the reduced specification 170 S-V.   The car that resulted combined the slightly larger body from the 170 S with the less powerful 45 HP engine that had previously powered the 170 V.   The vehicle provided reduced performance but at a reduced price, while salesmen steered more prosperous buyers to the new 180.   The diesel powered 170 S continued to be sold, now branded as the 170 S-D.   The internal “W 191” designation which had distinguished the previous 170 S was removed, and the 170 S manufactured from 1953 returned to the “W 136” designation that they had shared till the end of 1951.

In September 1955 the Mercedes-Benz 170 S-V was withdrawn from production.   There was no direct replacement.   By now economic recovery was setting in strongly, and Mercedes-Benz hoped to persuade company directors to buy a six-cylinder Mercedes-Benz.   In its final version, more than 80% of the cars sold were diesel powered, suggesting that for the most part cost conscious taxi operators had replaced status conscious executives as 170 S customers

Gallery

Notes

References

External links

 Mercedes Benz 170220 Club Website
 Mercedes Benz 170220 Club Forum

W191
W191
Rear-wheel-drive vehicles
Sedans
Limousines
1950s cars